Remus is the twin brother of the mythical founder of Rome.

Remus may also refer to:

Places
 Remus Glacier, Graham Land, Antarctica
 Remus River, Mexico
 Remuș, a village in Frătești Commune, Giurgiu County, Romania
 Ramosch (in German: Remüs), a former municipality in the canton of Graubünden, Switzerland
 Remus, an unincorporated community in Wheatland Township, Mecosta County, Michigan, United States
 Remus, Georgia, United States, an unincorporated community
 Remus, West Virginia, United States, an unincorporated community

People and fictional characters
 Remus (given name), a list of people and fictional characters
 Remus (surname), a list of people

Other uses
 Remus (moon), a moon of the asteroid 87 Sylvia
 HSwMS Remus (28), a Royal Swedish Navy destroyer
 USS Remus (ARL-40), a World War II landing craft repair ship
 REMUS (AUV), an underwater autonomous vehicle developed by Woods Hole Oceanographic Institution
 South Devon Railway Remus class, a South Devon Railway 0-6-0ST steam locomotive
 Remus (Star Trek), a fictional planet in Star Trek

See also
 Uncle Remus (disambiguation)
 Florinus of Remüs (died 856), Roman Catholic saint